Hernan "Chico" Borja (August 24, 1959 – January 25, 2021) was an Ecuadorian-born American soccer player and coach.  He spent time in the several U.S.-based leagues including the North American Soccer League, Major Indoor Soccer League and the American Soccer League. He also earned eleven caps with the U.S. national team.

He was a resident of Belleville, New Jersey.

Youth
Borja was born in Quito, Ecuador on August 24, 1959. His family immigrated to the United States where he attended New Jersey Institute of Technology (NJIT), where Borja played on the men's soccer team. At that time, NJIT played in the NCAA Division III. In 1980, his senior year, Borja was selected as a Division I First Team All American, the first NJIT men's soccer player to be named an All American. He finished his career with multiple entries in the NCAA record books for both single game and season scoring. In 1989, New Jersey Institute of Technology inducted Borja, a 1981 graduate, into its Hall of Fame.

NASL
Borja began his professional career as a midfield winger with the New York Cosmos of the North American Soccer League in 1981. In his first two years with the team, he played in two NASL championship games, losing the first and winning the second in 1982.

In 1983, the U.S. Soccer Federation, in coordination with the NASL, entered the U.S. national team, known as Team America, into the NASL as a league franchise. The team drew on U.S. citizens playing in the NASL, Major Indoor Soccer League and American Soccer League. Borja left the Cosmos and signed with Team America. When Team America finished the 1983 season with a 10–20 record, the worst in the NASL, USSF withdrew the team from the league. Borja returned to the Cosmos for the 1984 season. Although the Cosmos failed dismally, not making the playoffs, Borja's play earned him a place on the NASL North American all-star team that year. He finished his NASL career with 83 games, 20 goals and 24 assists. One of his scoring highlights came in a 1984 Cosmos 3–2 victory over Argentinos Juniors.

MISL
After the Cosmos folded, Borja joined the Las Vegas Americans of Major Indoor Soccer League (MISL).  He played a single season with the team before it was expelled from the league on July 17, 1985.

From Las Vegas, Borja, moved to the Wichita Wings for two seasons, 1986–1987 and 1987-1988 before his transfer to the Los Angeles Lazers. He was with L.A. for a single season, then returned to Wichita, with whom he remained until his retirement in 1992. He was named the MISL Pass Master (season assist leader) for the 1988–1989 season. In 1989 and 1990, Borja played on loan during the summer with the Albany Capitals of the American Soccer League.

Borja retired from the MISL eighth on the career points list (612 points) and fourth on the career assists list (338 assists).  Throughout his indoor career, he was a constant scoring threat. However, he was also noted for his lack of reluctance to get physical which led to numerous penalties.

National and Olympic teams
Borja began playing for the United States men's national soccer team in 1982. He finished his playing career with eleven caps and three goals. His first game was the lone U.S. game of 1982, a 2–1 win over Trinidad and Tobago on March 21, 1982.  In 1983, the U.S. played only one game, a 2–0 win over Haiti on April 8. Borja scored the second U.S. goal of the match.  In 1985, he played two World Cup qualification matches, scoring a goal in a 2–1 victory over Trinidad and Tobago. He finished his national team career in a scoreless World Cup qualification game with Jamaica on July 24, 1988, when he came on for Bruce Murray in the 61st minute.

In 1984, Borja was called up for the U.S. Olympic soccer team which competed at the 1984 Summer Olympics. Borja played all three games as the U.S. ran to a 1-1-1 record in group play, failing to qualify for the second round. While the U.S. fielded its full international team at the Olympics, these games do not count as national team games as FIFA did not recognize them as full internationals. Borja was also on the U.S. team at the 1987 Pan American Games.

While Borja retired from professional soccer in 1992, that year he played for the U.S. Futsal team which won the silver medal at the World Championship. Borja was selected to the tournament first team. He continued to play on the U.S. Futsal team until 1995, scoring a total of 9 goals, placing him in the top ten list of U.S. futsal players.

Coaching
After retiring from playing, Borja joined the coaching ranks. He began with the Houston Hotshots of the Continental Indoor Soccer League in 1994 and the Houston Force for their one competitive game in 1995. The Force folded after that single game. He also coached high school girls' soccer in Houston. He was on the National Soccer Coaches Association of America (NSCAA) National Staff and coached the Renegade Elite in Florida. Prior to 2012, he coached boys' soccer and girls' and boys' golf at Coral Glades High School in Coral Springs, Florida. He was also an Assistant Principal at South Plantation High School in Plantation, Florida.

References

External links
  NCAA Record Book
 NASL/MISL stats

1959 births
2021 deaths
Albany Capitals players
All-American men's college soccer players
American men's futsal players
American Professional Soccer League players
American Soccer League (1988–89) players
American soccer coaches
American soccer players
Ecuadorian footballers
Footballers from Quito
Ecuadorian football managers
Continental Indoor Soccer League coaches
Ecuadorian emigrants to the United States
Association football forwards
Association football midfielders
Association football utility players
Footballers at the 1984 Summer Olympics
Las Vegas Americans players
Los Angeles Lazers players
Major Indoor Soccer League (1978–1992) players
New Jersey Institute of Technology alumni
New York Cosmos players
North American Soccer League (1968–1984) players
North American Soccer League (1968–1984) indoor players
Footballers at the 1987 Pan American Games
Pan American Games competitors for the United States
Olympic soccer players of the United States
People from Belleville, New Jersey
Sportspeople from Essex County, New Jersey
Soccer players from New Jersey
Team America (NASL) players
United States men's international soccer players
Wichita Wings (MISL) players